Selem Safar (born 6 May 1987) is an Argentine professional basketball player of Syrian origin. He has also been a member the senior Argentine national basketball team, and their junior teams in the past.

Professional career
Safar has played in the top-tier level Argentine League.

National team career
As a member of the senior Argentine national basketball team, Safar played at the 2013 FIBA Americas Championship, the 2014 FIBA World Cup, and the 2015 FIBA Americas Championship.

Awards and accomplishments

Club career
Peñarol de Mar del Plata
2× Liga Nacional de Básquet: (2011, 2012)
Torneo Súper 8: (2011)
Argentine Cup: (2010)
San Lorenzo
FIBA Americas League: (2018)	
3× Liga Nacional de Básquet: (2012, 2017, 2018)
Torneo Súper 4: (2017)
Titanes de Barranquilla
3× Baloncesto Profesional Colombiano: (2020, 2021-I, 2021-II)

National team
Argentina
FIBA Americas Championship  bronze medal: (2013)

Individual
Baloncesto Profesional Colombiano Finals MVP: (2020)

References

External links
FIBA Profile
Eurobasket.com Profile

1987 births
Living people
2014 FIBA Basketball World Cup players
Argentine men's basketball players
Argentine people of Arab descent
Argentine people of Syrian descent
Argentino de Junín basketball players
Boca Juniors basketball players
Ciclista Juninense basketball players
Club Comunicaciones (Mercedes) basketball players
Obras Sanitarias basketball players
Olimpia de Venado Tuerto basketball players
Peñarol de Mar del Plata basketball players
Quilmes de Mar del Plata basketball players
Titanes de Barranquilla players
San Lorenzo de Almagro (basketball) players
Shooting guards
Small forwards
Sportspeople from Mar del Plata